Joseph Stephen Paduano (born January 22, 1965), also known by his nom de guerre Carapali Lualhati, is a Filipino politician who previously served as the House Minority Leader from 2020 to 2022. He has been the party-list representative for Abang Lingkod since 2014.

He was the national commander of the Revolutionary Proletarian Army-Alex Boncayao Brigade (RPA-ABB), an armed communist revolutionary group.

Activism 
Prior to his political career, Paduano was a member of the Revolutionary Proletarian Army—Alex Boncayao Brigade, the military wing of the Revolutionary Workers' Party, a communist party that split from the Communist Party of the Philippines. He went on the become its national commander with the nom de guerre of "Carapali Lualhalti." Paduano later disengaged from the group as he sought to participate in the 2013 elections as a party-list representative for Abang Lingkod, to which he was its first nominee.

Political career 
Despite his party-list winning more than 260,215 votes in the 2013 elections and earning them one seat in the House of Representatives, Paduano's group was disqualified by the Commission on Elections because it "didn't have a track record." However, on October 22, 2013, the Supreme Court reversed the election body's decision saying that the said party-list "need not prove track record." He was later sworn into office by then Speaker Feliciano Belmonte as the 290th member of the House of Representatives on May 28, 2014.

As the party-list's first nominee, Paduano continued to serve in the House of Representatives after his group was re-elected in the 2016 and 2019 elections.

In the 18th Congress, Paduano served as Deputy Minority Leader. Of all the representatives who hail from Negros Occidental, it was only Paduano who did not vote for Pateros–Taguig lone district representative Alan Peter Cayetano as Speaker in 2019 and instead, voted for Manila 6th district representative Bienvenido Abante as he was hoping to remain as Deputy Minority Leader. Abante was later elected as Minority Floor Leader.

He was a co-author to House Bill No. 3713, authored by Parañaque City 2nd district representative Joy Myra Tambunting, which sought to give a fresh 25-year franchise to ABS-CBN. During the 13th hearing on the network's franchise renewal on July 9, 2020, Paduano withdrew his co-authorship of the bill after concurring with the observations of Sagip party-list representative and Deputy Speaker Rodante Marcoleta that the network "has been funneling some of its income to Big Dipper" to "avoid paying taxes".

On October 19, 2020, he was unanimously elected to become the Minority Floor Leader after Abante's resignation on October 16, 2020. He is the first party-list representative to hold such a position.

References

1965 births
Filipino activists
Living people
Party-list members of the House of Representatives of the Philippines
Politicians from Negros Occidental